George L. Hanbury II (born 1943) is an American academic, and the President of Nova Southeastern University. Hanbury graduated with his bachelor's degree from Virginia Tech, a master's degree from Old Dominion University and his doctorate from Florida Atlantic University.  He became the President of Nova Southeastern University in 2010.

References

Living people
Florida Atlantic University alumni
Old Dominion University alumni
Presidents of Nova Southeastern University
Virginia Tech alumni
1943 births